William John Disch (October 15, 1872 – February 3, 1953) was an American baseball player and coach.  He served as the head baseball coach at the University of Texas at Austin from 1911 to 1939 and as an advisory coach for 12 seasons afterwards.

Career
Often called the Connie Mack of college baseball, Disch earned a 513–180–12 overall record at Texas, including a collegiate record of 465-115-9, and garnered 20 Southwest Conference titles with a conference record of 284-70-4.  At the time he coached, there were no NCAA postseason playoffs for national honors.  Along with Bibb Falk, Disch is one of the two namesakes of UFCU Disch–Falk Field.

Disch managed in minor league baseball, where he also was a player. He managed the 1911 Beeville Orange Growers to a 63–54 record and the Class D level Southwest Texas League championship. Disch also managed the 1903 Fort Worth Panthers of the Class D level Texas League and the 1915 Brenham Huskies of the Class D Middle Texas League for portions of their seasons.

He was listed as a scout for the Boston Red Sox of Major League Baseball in 1948.

Honors
In 1947, Disch Field at the University of Texas named for him. Today, the university ballpark, UFCU Disch–Falk Field, is named for Disch and Bibb A. Falk. 
Disch was inducted into the Texas Sports Hall of Fame in 1954.
In 1957, Disch was inducted into the Longhorn Hall of Honor at the University of Texas.
The College Baseball Coaches Association Hall of Fame inducted Disch in 1965.

Head coaching record

College baseball
The records shown below are only the collegiate record, not the overall record against non-collegiate teams.

References

External links
 
 

1872 births
1953 deaths
Boston Red Sox scouts
St. Edward's Hilltoppers baseball coaches
St. Edward's Crusaders football coaches
Texas Longhorns baseball coaches
Texas Longhorns football coaches
National College Baseball Hall of Fame inductees
People from Benton County, Missouri
Beeville Orange Growers players
Minor league baseball managers
Brenham Kaisers players